Antonio Durran Pierce (born October 26, 1978) is the linebackers coach for the Las Vegas Raiders of the National Football League.  He played college football for the University of Arizona.  He was signed by the Washington Redskins as an undrafted free agent, and also played for the New York Giants.

Early years
Pierce played high school football at Paramount High School in Paramount, California.  He played two years of football at Mount San Antonio College in Walnut, California, before transferring to the University of Arizona.  As a senior at Arizona, he had three sacks, 77 tackles (ten for losses), two forced fumbles, one interception, and one blocked kick.

Pierce was not taken in the 2001 NFL Draft after his senior year at Arizona because many NFL scouts considered him too undersized to play linebacker in the NFL.

Professional career

Washington Redskins

The Washington Redskins signed him as an undrafted rookie free agent in 2001.  He played in all 16 games as a rookie, with only eight starts.  He recorded 52 tackles, one sack, and one interception during his rookie campaign.  The interception came against Jake Plummer.  Over the next two seasons, Pierce played sporadically, recording only 18 and 15 tackles respectively, during the 2002 and 2003 seasons.  It was not until the 2004 season, his fourth in the league, that he played a full season replacing the injured Micheal Barrow.  That season Pierce logged a career-high 114 tackles, 95 of them solo.  He also had one forced fumble, one sack and two interceptions, including a pick off Ken Dorsey returned 76 yards for a touchdown.

New York Giants
The New York Giants signed Pierce on March 3, 2005 to start at middle linebacker.  He became the captain of the defense, and in 13 games, Pierce notched 100 tackles, 80 of them solo, two interceptions and one forced fumble returned for a touchdown.  His 2005 season ended early as he suffered a leg injury, against the Philadelphia Eagles, and missed the final three regular season games and the Giants' only postseason game, a 23–0 loss to the Carolina Panthers.

In 2006, Pierce recorded a career-high 138 tackles (109 solo), a sack, an interception, and defended eight passes.  Pierce was named as a first alternate for the Pro Bowl.  He was invited to play in Hawaii after Brian Urlacher suffered a toe injury in Super Bowl XLI, and withdrew from the Pro Bowl.

In the 2007 season, Pierce was a central figure in the Giants' path to their third Super Bowl title. He made a key tackle in the first half of the NFC Championship game against the Green Bay Packers, stopping running back Brandon Jackson on a screen pass on 3rd and 8, saving a touchdown and forcing the Packers to settle for a field goal instead. The Giants would go on to win in overtime.

Pierce was released by the team on February 11, 2010.

Retirement
Following his release, Pierce announced his retirement from football on July 8, 2010. He also stated that he would then begin his career as an NFL analyst for ESPN.

Coaching career
On February 7, 2014, Pierce was named the head coach at national powerhouse Long Beach Polytechnic High School, replacing Raul Lara, who stepped down as the head coach of the program after 13 seasons. After an 11-2 first season, the Jackrabbits struggled under Pierce, missing the playoffs for the first time in 36 years in his second season at the helm. The struggles continued in 2016 and 2017, with the program failing to reach double digit wins in both years and getting blown out in the playoffs.

Return to college
On December 21, 2017, Pierce announced his resignation as head coach and was named linebackers coach at Arizona State University. After two seasons as the Sun Devils' linebackers coach, Pierce was promoted to co-defensive coordinator alongside Marvin Lewis. On January 20. 2021 Pierce was elevated to be the sole defensive coordinator at ASU after sharing the role with Marvin Lewis during the 2020 season.

Personal
Pierce is married to Jocelyn and is the father of seven. He currently resides in Palos Verdes Estates, California. His father, Cleo Burrows, is from Bermuda.

Inspired by his own experiences growing up in Compton, it has become Pierce's mission to improve the quality of life for the youth in the Long Beach/Compton area.  For several years, Pierce has offered a free football camp for underprivileged youths.

In 2006, Pierce became the spokesperson for Giants Academy—a program for inner city youth geared toward helping these children succeed despite obstacles in their life.  He is also involved in the "Re=ad Across America" program where he reads to children whose parents are undergoing treatment for chemical dependency at the Odyssey House in Harlem.

In 2007, Pierce received the "United Way Man of the Year" award and was honored by the Catholic Diocese for his support of the community.

Pierce was honored at the 2008 ESPY awards along with the Giants.

Plaxico Burress Incident
Pierce was present when teammate Plaxico Burress accidentally shot himself in the thigh at the Latin Quarter Night Club in New York City on November 28, 2008. Police say that Pierce drove Burress to the hospital and then returned home with the gun in the glove compartment of his car. The police impounded Pierce's SUV to search for blood and gunpowder residue.  Burress was charged with, and ultimately pleaded guilty to, criminal possession of a weapon; however Pierce was not indicted on any charges. On August 3, 2009, Pierce was cleared of all criminal charges stemming from the incident. He was represented in the matter by notable NYC criminal defense attorney, Michael F. Bachner.

Broadcasting
Pierce served as a communications intern on The Howard Stern Show on May 7, 2008. He stated he would like to pursue a career in broadcasting after his NFL career. Near the end of the day's show he asked to stay for the remainder of the week, which Stern agreed to.

See also

 History of the New York Giants (1994–present)

References

External links

1978 births
Living people
People from Palos Verdes Estates, California
People from Ontario, California
Sportspeople from Long Beach, California
Sportspeople from Los Angeles County, California
Sportspeople from San Bernardino County, California
Players of American football from Long Beach, California
African-American players of American football
American football middle linebackers
Arizona Wildcats football players
Washington Redskins players
New York Giants players
National Conference Pro Bowl players
Coaches of American football from California
African-American coaches of American football
Arizona State Sun Devils football coaches
High school football coaches in California
21st-century African-American sportspeople
20th-century African-American sportspeople
Las Vegas Raiders coaches